Tourism was limited to the upper-class of ancient Rome due to its expense. Travel was also difficult because of shipwrecks, storms, poor maps, and a lack of modern means of transport. Tourism was difficult due to the time required to travel long distances in ancient Rome. Common destinations for ancient Roman tourists were Greece, Egypt, and the coast of Campania. Wealthy Romans would also spend the hottest parts of the year in villas outside of the city of Rome or in resort towns such as Baiae. These trips usually boosted the local economy as the locals attempted to supply the tourists with housing, goods, and services.

Methods of travel 

Travel was difficult to access for poorer Romans due to limited time and economic constraints. Shipwrecks, storms, poor maps, and weather conditions also presented challenges for tourists, although there was little piracy in ancient Rome. Roman roads were large and extensive networks. However, they were primarily used by the military during the Roman Republic. The roads were worse the further away one got from towns and cities. Roman tourists and travelers were provided with lodgings in inns. The Romans viewed hospitality, which they termed hospitium, as a moral obligation.

Attractions

Anatolia and Greece 
Roman tourists would frequently travel to Greece to witness the Olympic Games, the Pythian Games, the Isthmian Games, and the Nemean Games, as well as to visit Greek temples. It was common to travel to the islands of Lesbos, Rhodes, and Chios, and the islands of Ionia. Greek cities in Asia Minor and important settlements such as Athens were also popular tourist destinations. Roman tourists were attracted to sites such as the Colossus of Rhodes and Satyr of Protogenes. People would also travel to Greece to visit the Oracle of Delphi and other "oracles of the dead", which were located in caves and were believed to allow one to contact one's dead friends and family. Greece was also popular because the Romans saw non-Greco-Roman cultures as barbaric.

Egypt 
Egypt was the most popular area for tourists to travel to. The Romans viewed Egypt as exotic, mysterious, and ancient. Egyptian locals fed misinformation to the Romans to draw them in and profit from them. Alexandria and the Pyramids were the most popular sites in Egypt. Alexandria's most popular attractions were the Serapeum, the Musaeum, and the Pharos. Tourists would also visit the Bull of Apis in Memphis and the cities of Thebes and Luxor. It was a tradition for Roman aristocrats and emperors to sail across the Nile since Julius Caesar sailed across the Nile with Cleopatra.

Italy 

It was common to visit the areas by Herculaneum and Pompeii in the Gulf of Naples. Baiae was an ancient Roman town located in modern Bacoli on the Gulf of Naples. It was a popular resort in ancient Rome, primarily during the end of the Roman Republic. It was known for corruption, scandals, and hedonism. Bars dotted the area and upper-class women were said to pretend to be prostitutes, men were said to act like boys, and boys were said to act like girls. Another resort town called Puteoli was known for its danger and high night-time crime rates. It was a common practice for visitors to bring bodyguards with them. Wealthy Romans would commonly purchase vacation villas outside of the city of Rome, where they would spend the hottest months of the year. They could also be located on the coast of Campania in the Tyrrhenian Sea. Capri is an island in Italy where Emperor Tiberius built his resort villa, the Villa Jovis.

Motives 
During the reign of Augustus tourism and leisure assumed a more prominent role in Roman culture. It is unclear if people would take "Grand Tours" in which they traveled across the Mediterranean to see a wide variety of notable tourist attractions such as Athens and Delphi. Traveling this much may have been too expensive and dangerous. However, it is known people would travel across the Empire after winning notable battles or notable achievements. Most people would bring home memorabilia from their destination. People would also travel for the purposes of educating themselves. Greece, Massalia, and Alexandria were common destinations for these tourists. Cicero, a Roman orator, took a vacation to the eastern parts of the Empire to study philosophy and oratory in the 70s BCE. It was common for the influx of tourists to drastically alter the local economy. Locals often set up shops, worked as vendors, and provided services such as prostitution and lodgings to the tourists.

See also

References 

Ancient Roman culture
ancient Rome